Love, Sex and Eating the Bones is a 2003 Canadian romantic comedy film directed and written by Sudz Sutherland featuring a mostly African American and Black Canadian leading cast. It premiered and played twice at the 2003 Toronto International Film Festival, where it won the award for Best Canadian First Feature Film.

Synopsis
Michael (Hill Harper) is a likeable photographer turned security guard who spends his time hanging with his buddies and keeping up with the latest releases at Pornocopia. His addiction to porn, however, threatens to get in the way of a budding romance with Jasmine (Marlyne Afflack), an upscale marketing researcher who's so wary of ‘playas’ she's declared herself celibate.

Cast

Reception 
Rick Groen of The Globe and Mail awarded the film three stars. On review aggregator Rotten Tomatoes, the film has an approval rating of 57% based on 7 reviews, with an average rating of 6/10.

References

External links 
 

2003 films
English-language Canadian films
Canadian romantic comedy films
2003 romantic comedy films
Films directed by Sudz Sutherland
Films about pornography
2003 directorial debut films
2000s English-language films
2000s Canadian films